Kejia Wu (吴可佳) is the author of A Modern History of China's Art Market. She previously taught at Sotheby's Institute of Art in New York City and Claremont Graduate University's Drucker School of Management in Los Angeles. Her academic work has focused on the global art market, Asian art market and secondary art market. Kejia is considered an expert on the Chinese art market, and is a frequent speaker at events in the US, Europe and Asia. The Art Newspaper, ArtReview Asia and LEAP named her China Art Market Observer of the Year in 2019.

She is a columnist for the Financial Times Chinese Edition, mostly interviewing art experts and artists. She authored the annual TEFAF Art Market Report, which covered the most recent 40 years of China's art market and the first English language report to conduct primary research on Chinese private museum owners and top collectors.

References 

Living people
Chinese columnists
Chinese women columnists
Year of birth missing (living people)